Subarchaeopacha alberici is a moth in the family Cossidae, and the only species in the genus Subarchaeopacha. It is found in the Democratic Republic of Congo.

References

Natural History Museum Lepidoptera generic names catalog

Metarbelinae
Moths described in 1945